Binnish (also spelled Binsh) is a city in northwestern Syria, administratively belonging to the Idlib Governorate, located just north of Idlib. Nearby localities include Kafriya and Maarrat Misrin to the northwest, al-Fu'ah to the north,  Ta'um and Taftanaz to the northeast, Iffis to the southeast and Sarmin to the south. According to the Syria Central Bureau of Statistics (CBS), Binnish had a population of 52,000 in the 2011 census. Its inhabitants are predominantly Sunni Muslims.
 	
The city is situated on a hill. The city name Binnish is mentioned in the Tablets of Ebla 2400 BC. The city is famous for olive, vine and fig trees besides its varied crops of all kinds. It has a big old mosque right at the center which dates back to the Mamluk period (1250-1517) before the Ottomans. It has mild weather and hospitable people. Generally speaking, the people there are from all walks of life. The illiteracy rate is low compared to how it was 30 years ago.

References

Towns in Syria
Populated places in Idlib District
Haj Istaifi